Brisbin is an unincorporated community within the rural municipality of Harris.

See also 
 List of communities in Saskatchewan

References 

Harris No. 316, Saskatchewan
Unincorporated communities in Saskatchewan